Rachin Ravindra (born 18 November 1999) is a New Zealand cricketer. He made his international debut for the New Zealand cricket team in September 2021.

Early life
Ravindra was born to Indian parents in Wellington, New Zealand. His father Ravi Krishnamurthy, a software architect, played club-level cricket in his hometown Bangalore, before settling in New Zealand.

Career
He was part of New Zealand's squads for the 2016 Under-19 Cricket World Cup and the 2018 Under-19 Cricket World Cup. Following the conclusion of the 2018 Under-19 Cricket World Cup, the International Cricket Council (ICC) named Ravindra as the rising star of the squad. In June 2018, he was awarded a contract with Wellington for the 2018–19 season.

He made his List A debut for New Zealand A against Pakistan A on 21 October 2018. He made his first-class debut for New Zealand A, also against Pakistan A, on 30 October 2018. On 25 November 2019, batting for Wellington against Auckland in the 2019–20 Ford Trophy, Ravindra scored his first century in List A cricket. In March 2020, in round six of the 2019–20 Plunket Shield season, Ravindra scored his maiden century in first-class cricket.

In June 2020, he was offered a contract by Wellington ahead of the 2020–21 domestic cricket season. In November 2020, Ravindra was named in the New Zealand A cricket team for practice matches against the touring West Indies team. In the first practice match, Ravindra scored a century, with 112 runs.

In April 2021, Ravindra was named in New Zealand's Test squad for their series against England, and for the final of the 2019–21 ICC World Test Championship. In August 2021, Ravindra was named in New Zealand's Twenty20 International (T20I) squad for their tour of Bangladesh, and in New Zealand's One Day International (ODI) squad for their tour of Pakistan. Ravindra made his T20I debut on 1 September 2021, for New Zealand against Bangladesh.

In November 2021, Ravindra was named in New Zealand's Test squad for their series against India. He made his Test debut on 25 November 2021, for New Zealand against India.

In June 2022, Ravindra was signed by Durham County Cricket Club to play in the County Championship in England. Later the same month, on his debut for Durham, Ravindra scored a century against Worcestershire. He went on to convert that into his maiden double century in a first-class match, scoring 217 runs.

References

External links
 

1999 births
Living people
New Zealand cricketers
New Zealand Test cricketers
New Zealand Twenty20 International cricketers
Wellington cricketers
Cricketers from Wellington City
New Zealand sportspeople of Indian descent
New Zealand expatriate sportspeople in England
Durham cricketers